John Galway may refer to: 

John Galway (politician), a politician who represented Cork City in the Irish House of Commons in the 17th century,
John Galway (producer), a Canadian film and television producer.